Olympia Montana Valance (born 7 January 1993) is an Australian actress and model, whose roles include Paige Smith in the soap opera Neighbours (2014–2018, 2020, 2022) and Tahlia Woods in Playing for Keeps. For her role as Paige, Valance received a nomination for the Logie Award for Most Popular New Talent.

Early life
Olympia Valance was born in Melbourne, Victoria on 7 January 1993 to Rajko Vukadinović, a model and musician, and Tania Gogos. Valance's father is Serbian and her mother is Greek Australian. Her step-father is Australian musician Ross Wilson. Valance has seven half-siblings; Her older half-sister Holly Valance, with whom she shares Vukadinović as a father, is also a singer and an actress. Valance attended Shelford Girls' Grammar School and studied at the Melbourne Actor's Lab.

Career
In March 2014, it was announced that Valance would make her acting debut in the long-running soap opera Neighbours as Paige Smith. Valance had been a successful model prior to her casting and won the role after going through a long audition process, which included four call-backs. Her half-sister Holly previously appeared in the show as Felicity "Flick" Scully from 1999 until 2002. Valance was initially contracted for three years and she made her screen debut as Paige on 2 June 2014. Valance's portrayal of Paige earned her nominations for Most Popular New Talent at the Logie Awards and Best Daytime Star at the Inside Soap Awards in 2015. She appeared in a documentary special celebrating the show's 30th anniversary titled Neighbours 30th: The Stars Reunite, which aired in Australia and the United Kingdom in March 2015.

In December 2014, Valance became the new face and body of UK lingerie brand Gossard. Of her role, she said "The last year has been a whirlwind and to work with such an established name as Gossard is a dream come true. I absolutely love working on Neighbours and the fact that I am able to come over to England and do an incredible campaign like this is a credit to the show's following, both here and down under." Valance has appeared in photo shoots for the brand's swimwear and lingerie collections, including their 2015 spring/summer campaign. In July 2015, she became an ambassador for the Australian chocolate bar Cherry Ripe.

In January 2016, Valance was the ambassador of the Jeep Marquee for the annual Jeep Portsea Polo event. That same month, she revealed that she signed with California-based agency Roar after they came looking for her. The agency also looks after fellow Australian actors Liam and Chris Hemsworth, who have both had successful careers in Hollywood. Valance has expressed an interest in moving on from Neighbours once her three-year contract ends. On 1 December 2017, it was announced that Valance had filmed her last scenes as Paige. Wilson confirmed that Valance would be moving to Los Angeles in January 2018 to pursue film and television roles during pilot season.

Valance joined the cast of Network Ten's sports drama Playing for Keeps in May 2018. She plays Tahlia, a socialite who is engaged to the captain of an Australian rules football team. In January 2019, Network Ten announced Valance would compete on the  sixteenth season of Dancing with the Stars. Valance was paired with professional dancer Jarryd Byrne. On 18 March 2019, they became the fourth pair to be eliminated, despite receiving a high score from the judges for their jive.

In 2020, Valance reprised her role as Paige for Neighbours''' 35th anniversary. Valance was announced as a judge for the 2020 season of Australia's Got Talent, however due to the COVID-19 pandemic she never fulfilled the role. On 4 May 2022, Valance confirmed to Zoe Thomaidou of Neos Kosmos that she would be returning to Neighbours'' for the serial's final episodes. Olympia and half-sister Holly appeared in the season finale, the only episode in the show’s 37 year run to feature both of them.

Personal life
Valance announced in June 2019 that she was in a relationship with AFL footballer Tom Bellchambers. The couple announced their engagement in October 2020, and they married on 12 June 2022 in Daylesford.

In August 2020, Valance reported that in 2019 she was a victim of a cyber crime. Her phone was hacked and personal images were distributed without her consent.

Valance is the co-owner of Splash Vodka.

A lover of horse racing, Valance part-owns a horse named Mr. Sneaky that competed in the Spring Racing Carnival. In 2020, Valance was announced as a Caulfield Cup Carnival ambassador and judge of the Social Style Stakes.

Filmography

Awards and nominations

References

External links

1993 births
Living people
Australian female models
Australian soap opera actresses
21st-century Australian actresses
Actresses from Melbourne
Australian people of Greek descent
Australian people of Serbian descent